Gregory Island is located off the Kimberley coast of Western Australia.

References

Islands of the Kimberley (Western Australia)